Blastodacna hellerella is a moth in the family Elachistidae. It is found in most of Europe except the north. In the east, the range extends to the Caucasus.

Description
The wingspan is 10–13 mm. Adults are on wing from the May to August in one generation per year.

The larvae feed on midland hawthorn (Crataegus laevigata) and common hawthorn (Crataegus monogyna). There are unconfirmed records for blackthorn (Prunus spinosa), European plum (Prunus domestica) and apple (Malus species), although there may be confusion with other species. Larvae can be found from summer to autumn in fruit and tenanted berries have a small hole. Frass is not extruded. Pupation takes place in rotten wood during the autumn.

References

External links
 Lepiforum e. V.
 Ian Kimber: Guide to the moths of Great Britain and Ireland

Blastodacna
Moths described in 1838
Moths of Europe
Taxa named by Philogène Auguste Joseph Duponchel